The great evening bat (Ia io) is the largest bat in the vesper bat family (Vespertilionidae) and the only living species in the genus Ia. Their roost sites have been found both near the cave entrances and up to  within the cave systems.

Description
It is colored brown on the top and grayish on the bottom.

Not much is known about its habits and behavior. The bat usually lives in small groups. Its food consists of insects, as with most vesper bats. The great evening bat also sometimes feeds on small birds. The bat leaves its sleeping place in the late afternoon to search of food. During the winter months it may migrate to warmer regions.

Status
The IUCN lists its conservation status as near-threatened. One of the threats to its survival in South Asia is human influence by habitat destruction; many caves have been turned into attractions. They have also been disturbed by farmers collecting their excrement. Also the excessive use of insecticides poses a threat to the great evening bats.

Scientific name
At four letters, Ia io is tied with Yi qi for the shortest existing (and shortest possible) scientific name of any animal under the International Code of Zoological Nomenclature, and is one of very few scientific names composed solely of vowels. 

The name refers to Io, a woman of classical mythology, viewed as "flighty;" and ia (ἰά), a Greek term for a shout.

See also
List of short species names

References

Vesper bats
Taxa named by Oldfield Thomas
Mammals described in 1902
Mammals of Nepal